The Holmes and Rahe stress scale is a list of 43 stressful life events that can contribute to illness. The test works via a point accumulation score which then gives an assessment of risk. The American Institute of Stress for instance, regards a score of 300 or more as an "80% chance of health breakdown within the next 2 years". While there is good evidence that chronic stress can lead to ill health, there is not much evidence to support the ranking of stressful life events in this manner.

Development
In 1967, psychiatrists Thomas Holmes and Richard Rahe examined the medical records of over 5,000 medical patients as a way to determine whether stressful events might cause illnesses. Patients were asked to tally a list of 43 life events based on a relative score. A positive correlation of 0.118 was found between their life events and their illnesses.

Their results were published as the Social Readjustment Rating Scale (SRRS), known more commonly as the Holmes and Rahe Stress Scale.  Subsequent validation has supported the links between stress and illness.

Supporting research
Rahe carried out a study in 1970 testing the validity of the stress scale as a predictor of illness. The scale was given to 2,500 US sailors and they were asked to rate scores of 'life events' over the previous six months. Over the next six months, detailed records were kept of the sailors' health.  There was a +0.118 correlation between stress scale scores and illness, which was sufficient to support the hypothesis of a link between life events and illness.

In conjunction with the Cornell medical index assessing, the stress scale correlated with visits to medical dispensaries, and the H&R stress scale's scores also correlated independently with individuals dropping out of stressful underwater demolitions training due to medical problems. The scale was also assessed against different populations within the United States (with African, Mexican and White American groups). The scale was also tested cross-culturally, comparing Japanese and Malaysian groups with American populations.

Adults 
The sum of the life change units of the applicable events in the past year of an individual's life gives a rough estimate of how stress affects health.

Score of 300+: At risk of illness.

Score of 150-299: Risk of illness is moderate (reduced by 30% from the above risk).

Score <150: Only have a slight risk of illness.

Non-adults 
A modified scale has also been developed for non-adults.  Similar to the adult scale, stress points for life events in the past year are added and compared to the rough estimate of how stress affects health.

Score of 300+: At risk of illness.

Score of 150-299: Risk of illness is moderate. (reduced by 30% from the above risk)

Score <150: Slight risk of illness.

See also
 Life-Events and Difficulties Schedule
 Diathesis–stress model
 CernySmith Assessment

Medical:
 Allostatic load
 Hypothalamic–pituitary–adrenal axis
 Psychoneuroimmunology

References

Further reading
 Rahe RH et al. (2000). The stress and coping inventory: an educational and research instrument. Stress Medicine 16: 199-208.
 Life, Change, and Stress (Holmes & Rahe) - The Neuron

Medical scales
Psychological stress
Psychological tests and scales